Haranath may refer to:

 Haranath (actor) (1936-1989), Telugu actor
 Haranath Chakraborty, Bengali film director